was a town located in Echi District, Shiga Prefecture, Japan. It developed as Echigawa-juku in Edo period.

As of 2003, the town had an estimated population of 11,411 and a density of 881.84 persons per km2. The total area was 12.94 km2.

On February 13, 2006, Echigawa, along with the town of Hatashō (also from Echi District), was merged to create the town of Aishō.

Sister city 
 West Bend, Wisconsin, United States

External links 
 Aishō Official Web site

Dissolved municipalities of Shiga Prefecture